is a railway station located in an industrial area of the city of Mishima, Shizuoka Prefecture, Japan operated by the private railroad company Izuhakone Railway.

Lines
Mishima-Futsukamachi Station is served by the Sunzu Line, and is located 2.9 kilometers from the starting point of the line at Mishima Station.

Station layout
The station has one side platform serving a single track. The station building is staffed.

History 
Mishima-Futsukamachi Station was opened on December 15, 1932.

Passenger statistics
In fiscal 2017, the station was used by an average of 1483 passengers daily (boarding passengers only).

Surrounding area
Yokohama Rubber, Mishima plant
Morinaga, Mishima plant

See also
 List of Railway Stations in Japan

References

External links

 Official home page

Railway stations in Japan opened in 1932
Railway stations in Shizuoka Prefecture
Izuhakone Sunzu Line
Mishima, Shizuoka